Rita Choudhary is a politician from the Indian state of Rajasthan. She is a member of Rajasthan Legislative Assembly from Mandawa Constituency of Jhunjhunu.

Early life
Rita Choudhary was born in a humble family of Senior Congress Politician Ram Narain Choudhary at Hetamsar Village of Jhunjhunu District in Rajasthan.

Political career

Membership of the Rajasthan Legislative Assembly

References

Rajasthani politicians
Rajasthan MLAs 2008–2013
Living people
People from Jhunjhunu district
Indian National Congress politicians
Year of birth missing (living people)
Rajasthan MLAs 2018–2023